Stepanyan (also commonly spelled Stepanian) (Armenian: Ստեփանյան) is an Armenian surname, derived from Stepan (Armenian: Ստեփան), the Armenian equivalent of Stephen, and could refer to any of the following people:

 Arthur Stepanyan (born 1987), Armenian footballer
 Kalin Stepanyan (born 1955), Russian football coach
 Leo Stepanyan (1931–2002), Soviet and Armenian ornithologist
 Levon Stepanyan (born 1971), Armenian footballer
 Nelson Stepanyan (1913–1944), Soviet pilot
 Vahe Stepanyan (born 1948), Armenian lawyer
 Vardan Stepanyan (1966–1992), Armenian military commander

Surnames from given names
Armenian-language surnames
Patronymic surnames